= UK basketball =

UK basketball may refer to:

- Kentucky Wildcats men's basketball, at the University of Kentucky
- British Basketball League, in the United Kingdom
